Penicillium vasconiae is a species of fungus in the genus Penicillium which was isolated in Madrid in Spain.

References

Further reading 
 

vasconiae
Fungi described in 1980